Carleton is a federal electoral district in Ontario, Canada, represented in the House of Commons of Canada from 1867 to 1968 and since 2015. It was represented in the Legislative Assembly of Upper Canada from 1821 to 1840 and in the Legislative Assembly of the Province of Canada from 1841 until 1866.

The original riding was created by the British North America Act of 1867. However, the riding had existed since 1821 in the Parliament of Upper Canada and the Parliament of the Province of Canada. It originally consisted of Carleton County. In 1966, it was redistributed into the new electoral districts of Grenville—Carleton, Lanark and Renfrew, Ottawa Centre, Ottawa West and Ottawa—Carleton.

This riding was re-created by the 2012 electoral redistribution from parts of Nepean—Carleton (59%), Carleton—Mississippi Mills (41%) and a small portion of Ottawa South. It was contested in the 2015 federal election.

Demographics
According to the Canada 2021 Census

Ethnic groups: 71.4% White, 5.9% South Asian, 5.1% Arab, 4.1% Chinese, 4.0% Indigenous, 3.8% Black, 1.4% Southeast Asian, 1.0% West Asian, 1.0% Latin American
Languages: 68.6% English, 7.0% French, 3.8% Arabic, 2.1% Mandarin, 1.0% Spanish
Religions: 57.2% Christian (31.3% Catholic, 5.5% Anglican, 5.1% United Church, 2.0% Christian Orthodox, 1.3% Presbyterian, 1.0% Pentecostal, 11.0% Other), 8.1% Muslim, 2.0% Hindu, 1.0% Buddhist, 29.9% None
Median income: $58,400 (2020) 
Average income: $72,300 (2020)

Riding history
The federal riding consisted initially of Carleton County. In 1882, it was redefined to consist of the townships of Nepean, North Gower, Marlboro, March, Torbolton and Goulbourn, and the village of Richmond. In 1903, it was redefined to consist of the county of Carleton, excluding the city of Ottawa and the townships of Gloucester and Osgoode.

In 1914, it was redefined to include parts of the city of Ottawa not included in either the electoral district of Ottawa or Rideau Ward of Ottawa.

In 1924, it was redefined as consisting of the county of Carleton, excluding the townships of Gloucester and Osgoode and that part of the city of Ottawa lying east of a line drawn from south to north along the Canadian Pacific Railway line, Somerset Street, Bayswater Avenue, Bayview Road, and Mason Street to the Ottawa River.

In 1933, it was redefined as consisting of the county of Carleton, excluding the township of Gloucester, the town of Eastview, the village of Rockcliffe Park and the part of the city of Ottawa lying east of Parkdale Avenue.

In 1947, it was redefined as consisting of the county of Carleton, excluding the township of Gloucester, the town of Eastview and the village of Rockcliffe Park, and including the parts of Victoria and Elmdale wards in the city of Ottawa west of Parkdale Avenue, the part of Dalhousie ward south of Carling Avenue, the part of Capital ward south of Carling Avenue and Linden Terrace, and the part of Riverdale ward south of Riverdale Avenue and west of Main Street.

In 1952, it was redefined as consisting of the county of Carleton (excluding the township of Gloucester, the town of Eastview and the village of Rockcliffe Park), and the part of the city of Ottawa west of a line drawn from north to south along Parkdale Avenue, east along Carling Avenue, north along O'Connor Street, east along Linden Terrace to the Rideau Canal, south along the canal, east along Echo Drive, northeast along Riverdale Avenue, south along Main Street, southwest along the Rideau River.

The electoral district was abolished in 1966 when it was redistributed between Grenville—Carleton, Lanark and Renfrew, Ottawa Centre, Ottawa West and Ottawa—Carleton ridings.

The riding was recreated in 2015 by the 2012 federal electoral boundaries redistribution and was legally defined in the 2013 representation order. Initially, the riding was known as Rideau—Carleton. 40.58% of the riding came from the riding of Carleton—Mississippi Mills, 59.37% from Nepean—Carleton and 0.04% from Ottawa South. It came into effect upon the call of the next federal election in October 2015.

Members of Parliament of Upper Canada
(returned two members from 1831 to 1840)

William Morris (1821–1825)
George Thew Burke (1825–1829)
Thomas Mabon Radenhurst (1829–1831)
Hamnett Kirkes Pinhey (1831) and John Bower Lewis (1831–1840)
George Lyon (1831–1835)
Edward Malloch (1835–1840)

Members of Parliament of the Province of Canada
James Johnston, Reformer (1841–1846)
George Lyon, Conservative (1846–1848)
Edward Malloch (1848–1854)
William F. Powell, Conservative (1854–1866)

Members of Parliament

This riding has elected the following Members of Parliament:

Election results

Carleton, 2015–present

Carleton, 1867–1968

See also

 List of Canadian federal electoral districts
 Past Canadian electoral districts
 Canadian federal electoral redistribution, 2012

References

External links
Riding history from the Library of Parliament

Former federal electoral districts of Ontario
Federal electoral districts of Ottawa
Ontario federal electoral districts
1821 establishments in Canada
1840 disestablishments in Canada
1841 establishments in Canada
1866 disestablishments in Canada
1867 establishments in Ontario
1966 disestablishments in Ontario
2013 establishments in Ontario